The 1979 UNLV Rebels football team was an American football team that represented the University of Nevada, Las Vegas as an independent during the 1979 NCAA Division I-A football season. In their fourth year under head coach Tony Knap, the team compiled a 9–1–2 record.

Schedule

References

UNLV
UNLV Rebels football seasons
UNLV Rebels football